Gibbin's Brook is a  biological Site of Special Scientific Interest in Sellindge in Kent.

This site is mainly marshy grassland, but it also has a stream, a pond and small areas of bog and dry acidic grassland. It is notable for its invertebrates, especially moths.

The site is open to the public and a footpath runs through it.

References

Sites of Special Scientific Interest in Kent